Thermococcus chitonophagus is a chitin-degrading, hyperthermophilic archaeon isolated from a deep-sea hydrothermal vent. It is anaerobic, round to slightly irregular coccus-shaped, 1.2–2.5 μm in diameter, and motile by means of a tuft of flagella.

T. chitonophagus is one of only three species of archaeon that can grow on chitin.  The chitinase was isolated and found to have a molecular weight of 70 kDa.  It retains 50% of its activity after an hour at 120 °C.

References

Further reading

External links

LPSN
WORMS entry
Type strain of Thermococcus chitonophagus at BacDive -  the Bacterial Diversity Metadatabase

Archaea described in 1996
Euryarchaeota